The Harri Jones Memorial Prize for Poetry is an annual prize awarded by the University of Newcastle, Australia, to “an Australian poet, not yet 36 years of age, whose work in the field of poetry is judged to be outstanding”. The Prize is named for T. Harri Jones a former lecturer at the university.

Winners 

 2021: Josie/Jocelyn Deane
 2020: Peter Ramm
 2019: Caitlin Maling
 2018: Chloe Wilson
 2017: Joan Fleming
 2016: Katie Mills
 2010:
 2009: Jacqueline Krynda
 2008:
 2007: Amanda Ireland
 2006:
 2005: Andrew Slattery
 2004: Katie Lawrence
 2003: Julian Polain
 2002: Michelle A. Taylor, Angel of Barbican High (UQP)
 2001:
 2000:
 1999:
 1998: B. R. Dionysius
 1997: Michael Farrell
 1996: Anthony Lawrence
 1993: Andy Kissane, Facing the Moon (Five Islands)
 1988: Sudesh Mishra, "Rahu"
 1987: Yvette Christiansë 
 1984: Stephen Edgar
 1976: Jennifer Maiden, The Problem of Evil (Prism)
 1975: Robert Harris
 1973: Rhyll McMaster, The Brineshrimp (UQP)
 1972: J. S. Harry, The Deer Under the Skin

References 

Australian poetry awards